The 2007–08 season is South China's 2nd year after giving up the all-Chinese policy. This article shows statistics of the club's players in the season, and also lists all matches that the club have and will play in the season.

Events

On the 24 July 2007, South China were beaten 3-1 by Liverpool in the Barclays Asia Trophy 2007. Liverpool goals were scored by John Arne Riise, Xabi Alonso and Daniel Agger. South China's goal was scored by  Li Haiqiang who found the net by curving the ball from 46 yards into the top left corner.
On the 27 July 2007, Fulham beat South China 4-1 in the 3rd place play-off. South China pull one back after 56 minutes when Li Haiqiang’s quickly taken free-kick was volleyed home in impressive fashion by Flavio Barros.
On November 27, 2008, Hong Kong Red Cross officially entered a charity partnership with the club and its logo will be printed on SCAA team jerseys, extending and spreading humanity everywhere the team goes. The charity partnership is a pioneer between a sports association and a humanitarian organization in Hong Kong.
On March 9, 2008, an All-Star team primarily consisting of SCAA players (credited as Hong Kong Union) hosted a friendly versus Los Angeles Galaxy in the MLS side's last match in their preseason tour of Asia. The Hong Kong side won the penalty shootout 5-4 after drawing 2-2 in regulation.

Players

Squad stats

Players in/out

In
 Wong Chin Hung (黃展鴻) from Rangers
 Yip Chi Ho (葉志豪) from Rangers
 Flavio Barros (巴路士) from Vila Nova Futebol Clube (loan)
 Sidrailson (沙域臣) from Santa Cruz (Brazilian Pernambuco Football Championship Série A1) (loan)
 Juninho Petrolina (S·祖利亞) from Central (Brazilian Campeonato Pernambucano Série A1 / Campeonato Brasileiro Série C)
  Fan Weijun (樊偉軍) from Rangers
 Du Ping (杜蘋) from Shaanxi Baorong (Chinese Super League) (loan)
  Cris (基斯) from Metropolitano (Brazilian Campeonato Catarinense) (loan)
 Itaparica (伊達) from Paysandu (loan)
 Maxwell (麥士維) from Riffa Club (Bahraini Premier League)
 Nuno (盧諾) from Moreirense FC (Portuguese Second Division Serie A)
 Chung Ho Yin (鍾皓賢) from Eastern (return from loan)
 Tales Schütz (T·史高斯) from Leixões (Portuguese Liga)

Out
 Edemar Picoli (比高) to Eastern
  Cris (基斯) to Metropolitano (return from loan)
 Yaw Anane (友友) to Citizen (return from loan)
 Cleiton (基頓) to Santa Cruz (return from loan)
 Mihailo Jovanović (袓雲奴域) (released)
 Wong Chun Yue (黃鎮宇) (released)
 Au Wai Lun (歐偉倫) (retired)
 Tales Schütz (T·史高斯) to Grêmio Inhumense (Brazilian Campeonato Goiano) (return from loan)
 Chung Ho Yin (鍾皓賢) to Eastern (loan)
 Juninho Petrolina (S·祖利亞) to ABC (Brazilian Campeonato Potiguar / Campeonato Brasileiro Série C)
 Liang Zicheng (梁子成) to Rangers (loan)
 Flavio Barros (巴路士) to Vila Nova (return from loan)
 Du Ping (杜蘋) (released)
 Nuno (盧諾) to Rangers

Club

Coaching staff

Kit

Other information

Competitions

Hong Kong First Division League

Results by round

Matches

Hong Kong First Division

Senior Shield

League Cup

AFC Cup

FA Cup

Friendly

References

South China AA seasons
South China Aa